Kendriya Vidyalaya, IIT Powai (also known as Kendriya Vidyalaya, IIT Bombay and KV Powai), is an Indian Institute of Technology (IIT) secondary school affiliated to Central Board of Secondary Education (CBSE) board in Mumbai, India. It was established on 15 December 1964. It is part of the Kendriya Vidyalaya Sangathan. It is considered to be one of the top government schools in India. It was ranked 2nd on the top 10 rankings for government day schools by the Education World India School Rankings 2015.

History 
Kendriya Vidyalaya, IIT Powai was founded on 15 December 1964 by the founder-principal S. Ramchandran, under the guidance of the former director of IIT Bombay, Devang Vipin Khakkar.

Campus 
Kendriya Vidyalaya, IIT Powai is located within the IIT Bombay campus in Powai, a suburb in northwestern Mumbai. It is housed within a three-storied building with 3 wings, for the primary, secondary and senior secondary sections.

Facilities

See also
 List of Kendriya Vidyalayas

References 

Schools in Mumbai
Kendriya Vidyalayas